This is a list of punk styles/artists.

Classic era of Punk 1970s-1980s

American punk
The Ramones
Johnny Thunders and the Heartbreakers
Richard Hell
Television
Patti Smith
The Misfits
The Dead Boys
Social Distortion
Bad Religion
Joan Jett
The Cramps
The Adolescents
Black Flag
Circle Jerks
Dead Kennedys
X
Anti-Flag
Fear
Mourning Noise
Sand in the Face
The Vandals
45 Grave

C.B.G.B./New York punk
The Ramones
Johnny Thunders and the Heartbreakers
Richard Hell
Television
Patti Smith
Talking Heads
Blondie
The Dead Boys
Agnostic Front
Kraut
Cro-Mags
The Beastie Boys
Reagan Youth

British punk
Sex Pistols
The Clash
The Damned
The Buzzcocks
999
Stiff Little Fingers (Northern Ireland)
Sham 69
The Jam
The Pogues
Siouxsie and the Banshees
Blitz
Killing Joke
Vice Squad
GBH
Action Pact
Discharge
Stranglers
The Business
Chelsea
Generation X (band)
The Adicts
Bauhaus
Wire
Joy Division
Billy Idol

Psychobilly

Reverend Horton Heat
The Meteors
The Cramps
Horrorpops
The Tigers
The Young Werewolves
Levi and the Rockats
7 Shot Screamers
Volbeat
Nekromantix
Elvis Hitler
The Living End

Cowpunk

The Gun Club
Jason and the Scorchers
The Blasters
The Knitters
The Beat Farmers
Los Lobos
Texas Tornados
Legendary Shack Shakers

Oi!

Sham 69
The Business
Cockney Rejects
Cock Sparrer
The Warriors
The 4-Skins
The Exploited
Angelic Upstarts
The Blood
English Dogs
The Adicts
Attak
U.K. Subs
The Oppressed

New wave and post-punk

The Stranglers
The Pretenders
Depeche Mode
Talking Heads
The Undertones

Modern punk and derivatives 1990-present

Pop punk

Green Day
Less Than Jake
Sum 41
Prima Donna
My Chemical Romance
Jeff Rosenstock
Blink 182
Bomb The Music Industry!  
The Brave Little Abacus
Weezer

Skate punk

NOFX
Suicidal Tendencies
Bad Religion
The Offspring
Pennywise
Agent Orange
The Faction
JFA
Strung Out

Grunge

Stone Temple Pilots
Nirvana
Mudhoney
Pearl Jam
Alice In Chains

See also
List of glam punk artists
List of psychobilly bands
List of American grunge bands
List of new wave artists and bands

Artists And Style